All the Cats Join In is a song written by Ray Gilbert, Eddie Sauter and Alec Wilder, and first recorded by Benny Goodman. It later was a track on an LP with the same title by trumpeter Buck Clayton.

Benny Goodman 

Curiously, Goodman recorded this song three times. The first-released version, released after the ASCAP boycott of 1944-1948, followed a version which was only put out later.

The third recording was for a segment of the 1946 Walt Disney film Make Mine Music.

Clayton record

The record album was subtitled 25 Star Jazzmen in a Buck Clayton Jam Session. It was recorded between 1953 and 1956 and released by Columbia.

The Allmusic review by Scott Yanow stated "Everyone plays at least up to their usual high level and the riffing behind some of the solos really generates a lot of excitement".

Track listing 
 "All The Cats Join In" (Alec Wilder, Eddie Sauter, Ray Gilbert) – 7:14
 "Out of Nowhere" (Johnny Green, Edward Heyman) – 7:03
 "Don't You Miss Your Baby" (Count Basie, Eddie Durham, Jimmy Rushing) – 6:30
 "Lean Baby" (Billy May, Roy Alfred) – 8:20
 "Blue Lou" (Edgar Sampson, Irving Mills) – 10:04
Recorded in NYC on December 16, 1953 (track 4), March 15, 1955 (tracks 2 & 5) and March 5, 1956 (tracks 1 & 3)

Personnel 
Buck Clayton – trumpet
Billy Butterfield (tracks 1 & 3), Joe Newman (track 4) – trumpet
Ruby Braff – cornet (tracks 1 & 3)
Henderson Chambers (track 4), Bennie Green (tracks 2 & 5), Urbie Green (track 4), Dicky Harris (tracks 2 & 5), J. C. Higginbotham (tracks 1 & 3) – trombone
Tyree Glenn – trombone, vibraphone (track 1)
Lem Davis – alto saxophone (track 4)
Julian Dash (tracks 1, 3 & 4), Coleman Hawkins (tracks 1-3 & 5), Buddy Tate (tracks 2 & 5) – tenor saxophone
Charles Fowlkes – baritone saxophone (track 4)
Sir Charles Thompson – piano, celeste (track 4)
Ken Kersey (tracks 1 & 3), Al Waslohn (tracks 2 & 5) – piano
Steve Jordan (tracks 1-3 & 5), Freddie Green (track 4) – guitar
Milt Hinton (tracks 2 & 5), Walter Page (tracks 1, 3 & 4) – bass 
Bobby Donaldson (tracks 1 & 3), Jo Jones (tracks 2, 4 & 5) – drums

References 

1956 albums
Buck Clayton albums
Columbia Records albums